Kukës International Airport Zayed-North Wings, also referred to as Kukës International Airport Zayed, is an international airport in Kukës, Kukës County, Albania. The main purpose of Kukës International Airport is to serve as an alternative airport to Tirana International Airport Nënë Tereza.

The airport was built with United Arab Emirates investments made at the time of Sheikh Zayed bin Sultan Al Nahyan and to honor these investments, the airport bears the name of Sheikh Zayed. It is designed to serve as a low-cost airport.

History

Beginnings as domestic airfield
The beginnings of Kukës International Airport date back to 1929 when on 20 April it opened for the first time as a domestic airfield offering air connection between Tirana and Kukës via Peshkopi. The air link was operational for 15 years until the communist regime did not see fit to allow it to function as a civil airfield and turned it into a military airfield.

Reactivation and transformation
During the Kosovo War, the United Arab Emirates organized a modern camp in Kukës to help Kosovo War refugees. First, they developed an airfield for the supply of incoming aid to Kukës. At that time, the United Arab Emirates representatives presented the idea for the development of the civil airport as a gift to the area, which faced the largest influx of citizens of Kosovo. After accepting this idea, the Kukës Airport project was further developed with joint studies of the General Directorate of Civil Aviation and investors. Based on the decision of the Council of Ministers of 15 February 2001, a Memorandum of Understanding was approved between the Government of the Republic of Albania and the Government of the United Arab Emirates for the construction of Kukës Airport.

Construction of the airport began on 10 May 2003 and was completed on 31 October 2005 and expected to employ more than 200 people, helping the local economy by opening more touristic opportunities for the region. The total investment amount was approximately $20 million, funding-gift from the government of the United Arab Emirates. On 7 June 2006, Kukës Airport came under the administration of the General Directorate of Civil Aviation, which after 2010 was renamed the Civil Aviation Authority.

In 2021, the name was changed to Kukës International Airport Zayed by Prime Minister Edi Rama, in honour of Sheikh Zayed bin Sultan Al Nahyan who sponsored the investment.

The opening ceremony of Kukës International Airport took place on 18 April 2021. To commemorate the occasion Air Albania Flight 9003 arrived from London Stansted Airport after making a short stopover at Tirana International Airport Nënë Tereza as the airport had not been approved for international flights at the time. On 9 July 2021, the first-ever international commercial flight landed at Kukës Airport where Helvetic Airways Flight 8174 arrived from Zurich Airport.

Facilities
The airport can accommodate small to medium-sized aircraft. The apron offers parking spots for up to three aircraft and the terminal is equipped to handle up to 500,000 passengers annually.

Airlines and destinations
The following airlines operate regular scheduled and charter flights at Kukës Airport:

Statistics

See also
List of airports in Albania
Tirana International Airport Nënë Tereza

Notes and references

Notes

References

External links

 

Airports in Albania
2021 establishments in Albania
Airports established in 2021
Buildings and structures in Kukës County